The category of Fiesta of National Tourist Interest in Spain is an honorary designation given to festivals or events held in Spain and that offer real interest from the tourism perspective.

January

February

March

April

May 
From 1 to 6:  Fiestas Mayores de Almansa (Moros y Cristianos).www.agrupaciondecomparsas.com

First Sunday of Pentecost, La Caballada of Atienza (Guadalajara).

First Sunday of May, Fiestas Aracelitanas. Lucena (Córdoba). http://www.virgendearaceli.com

First Sunday of May, Pilgrimage of San Benito Abad.El Cerro de Andévalo http://www.sanbenitoelcerro.com

First weekend of May: Day of the Almadía. Burgi (Navarre). http://www.almadiasdenavarra.com

First week of May: Fiesta de las Cruces, Córdoba.

Fiesta of the first Friday of May, in Jaca (Huesca).

1–2. Romería de Nuestra Señora de la Estrella. Navas de San Juan (Jaén).

Fiestas de la Santa Cruz. Santa Cruz de Tenerife.

Fiestas de la Santísima Vera Cruz. Caravaca de la Cruz (Murcia).

Fiesta de la Santa Cruz. Feria (Badajoz).

3 al 14. Festival de los Patios Cordobeses. Córdoba

10–15. Fiestas Patronales de Santo Domingo. Santo Domingo de la Calzada (La Rioja).

14–18. Fiestas Patronales de Madrid (Fiestas de San Isidro)., Madrid.

14–18. Fiestas Hispano-Arabs in honor to Saint Boniface. Petrer (Alicante).

17. Festa de la Llana. Ripoll (Girona).

L'aplec del cargol. (Lleida)

31. Pilgrimage of San Isidro Labrador. Realejo Alto (Santa Cruz de Tenerife).

May 31-June 1. Festa Major de Sant Feliu de Pallerols (Girona).

Last week of May: Feria de Córdoba.

Variable date.  Feria de Mayo de Dos Hermanas - Seville

June

July 

Second Sunday. Festas de San Antón. Gastronomic Fiesta da Solla, Catoira (Pontevedra)

First Friday. The Coso Blanco. Castro Urdiales (Cantabria).

4–6. A Rapa das Bestas of A Estrada (Pontevedra).

4–12. Els Bous a la Mar. Dénia (Alicante).

Fiestas del Cordero. Lena (Asturias).

A Rapa das Bestas of Viveiro (Lugo).

5–11. International Rafting of the River Noguera-Pallaresa. Sort (Lleida).

10–12. Festival of the Cider of Nava. Nava (Asturias).

11. Festas de San Benitiño de Lérez. Pontevedra.

12. Aplec de la Sardana. Olot (Girona).

12. Romería Regional de San Benito Abad. San Cristóbal de La Laguna (Santa Cruz de Tenerife).

16. Fiestas de la Virgen del Carmen. San Pedro del Pinatar (Region of Murcia).

19–22. Commemorates Fiestas to the Battle of Bailén. Bailén (Jaén).

20–23. Tortosa Renaissance Festival. (Tortosa, Catalonia).

22–23. Dance of the Stilts. Anguiano (La Rioja).

24. Festes Tradicionals de Santa Cristina. Lloret de Mar (Girona).

24–30. Fiestas Patronales de Santa Ana. Tudela (Navarre).

25. Fiesta del Pastor. Cangas de Onís (Asturias).

26. Fiesta de Los Vaqueiros d'Alzada. Luarca (Asturias).

August

September 

1–8. Fiestas of the Wine. Valdepeñas (Ciudad Real).

3–6. Fiestas of the Mutiny. Aranjuez (Community of Madrid).

3–8. Feria y Fiestas en Honor a María Santísima de la Sierra Cabra (Córdoba)

4–9. Moros y Cristianos of Villena. Villena (Alicante).

5–6. Fiestas del Santo Niño. Majaelrayo (Guadalajara).

6 and 9. The Cascamorras. Baza and Guadix (Granada)

6. Festes de la Beata. Santa Margalida (Balearic Islands).

6–10. Moros y Cristianos of Caudete. Caudete (Albacete).

7–8. Festes de la Mare de Déu de la Salut. Algemesí (Valencia).

7–8. Moros y Cristianos of L'Olleria. L'Olleria (Valencia).

Around day 8. Feria y Fiestas de Nuestra Señora de Consolación. Utrera (Seville).

8. Pilgrimage of Nuestra Señora de Los Ángeles. Alájar (Huelva).

8. Fiesta de la Virgen de La Guía. Llanes (Asturias).

8. Fiesta de la Virgen Nuestra Señora de las Nieves. La Zarza (Badajoz)

8. Fiestas de Nuestra Señora del Pino. Teror (Las Palmas de Gran Canaria).

8–9. Festes de la Mare de Déu de l'Ermitana. Peñíscola (Castellón).

9–12. International Festival of Folklore in the Mediterranean.

11–14.Pilgrimage of Virxe da Barca. Muxía (A Coruña).

12–15. Festa Major and Correbou. Cardona (Barcelona).

12–15. Fiestas Patronales de Graus in honor to Santo Cristo and San Vicente Ferrer. Graus (Huesca).

13. Pilgrimage of Nuestra Señora de Chilla. Candeleda (Ávila).

13. Pilgrimage to la Virgen de Gracia. San Lorenzo de El Escorial (Community of Madrid).

14. Bullfighting in the Sea. Candás (Asturias).

15. Toro de la Vega. Tordesillas (Valladolid).

15–24. Festes de Santa Tecla. Tarragona

17–23. Carthaginians and Romans. Cartagena (Murcia).

17–21. Real Feria y Fiesta de la Vendimia. La Palma del Condado (Huelva).

19. Day of America in Asturias. Oviedo (Asturias).

20. Pilgrimage of Santísimo Cristo del Caloco. El Espinar (Segovia).

18–20. Fiestas de San Mateo of Camarena de la Sierra (Teruel).

20–26. Fiestas de San Mateo of Logroño. Logroño (La Rioja).

24. La Mercè. Barcelona.

27. Pilgrimage in Honor to the Saints Martyrs Cosmas and Damian. Mieres (Asturias).

27. Day of Campoo. Reinosa (Cantabria).

October 
Festes de la Sagrada Família i el Santíssim Crist. La Vall d'Uixó (Castellón).

First weekend of October, Fiestas de Nuestra Señora de los Prado. Garganta de los Montes (Community of Madrid).

4–12. Festas de San Froilán, Lugo.

6–13. Festa of the Seafood. O Grove (Pontevedra).

Around day 12. Fiestas del Pilar. Zaragoza

10–13. Moros y Cristianos of Callosa d'En Sarrià. Callosa d'En Sarrià (Alicante).

17–19. As San Lucas. Mondoñedo (Lugo).

Third Sunday of October. Pilgrimage of Valme. Dos Hermanas (Seville).

November 
Fiesta de los Humanitarios de San Martín. Moreda de Aller (Asturias).
Feria de todos los santos. Cocentaina (Alicante).

December

See also 
 Fiestas of International Tourist Interest of Spain

References

External links 
 BOE - Order of 29 September 1987 regulating the declarations of International and National Tourist Interest Effective through June 8, 2006.
 Local fiestas of National Tourist Interest of Spain (secular) Calendar in iCalendar format.

Spanish culture
Festivals in Spain
Cultural tourism in Spain